Andrew, Andy or Drew Hill may refer to:

Music
Andrew Hill (jazz musician) (1931–2007), American jazz pianist and composer
 Andy Hill (American music producer) (born 1951), American record producer and educator
 Andy Hill (composer) (born 1957), British music producer and songwriter
 Andrew Hill or Charlton Hill (born 1975), Australian actor and singer-songwriter

Sports
 Andrew Hill (footballer) (born 1980), Australian rules footballer
 Drew Hill (1956–2011), American football player
 Andy Hill (footballer) (born 1965), English footballer
 Andy Hill (basketball) (born  1950), American basketball player, TV executive, author, and speaker

Other
 Andrew Hill (MP), Member of Parliament of (then) Great Britain for Bishop's Castle
 Andrew P. Hill (1853–1922), American artist, photographer and environmentalist
 Andrew Hill High School (opened 1956), named for Andrew P. Hill
 Andrew Hill (anthropologist) (1946–2015), British palaeoanthropologist
 Andrew Hill (artist) (born 1952), Australian artist in the Progressive Art Movement in Adelaide in the 1970s
 Andy Hill (politician) (1962–2016), American politician
 Andy Hill (pilot), pilot of plane that crashed in the 2015 Shoreham Airshow crash